The Niagara Aerospace Museum is an aviation museum located in Niagara Falls, New York, in the old terminal building of the Niagara Falls International Airport. The museum has been located in a number of places in the Niagara Falls/Buffalo area.  It had been located in the Niagara Office Building in downtown Niagara Falls and relocated in 2008 to the site of the then HSBC center on the waterfront in Buffalo, NY, where it was known as the Ira G. Ross Aerospace Museum.  In the summer of 2013, the museum moved to its current location.

Both Bell Aircraft Corporation and Curtiss-Wright Corporation had corporate headquarters, research & development (R&D), and manufacturing operations nearby in the middle of the twentieth century, and much of the material on display is from these two aviation companies.  Among its many displays are many examples of early to mid-twentieth century piston, turbo-jet, turbo-shaft, and jet engines, as well as several static display aircraft including early Bell helicopters, an example of the World War II Bell P-39 Airacobra, and the Bell X-22 tilt-ducted-fan VSTOL aircraft.

See also
List of museums in New York
List of aerospace museums

References

External links
Niagara Aerospace Museum official site
Niagara Aerospace Museum Builds its Collection – Warbirds News
EARNING ITS WINGS AEROSPACE MUSEUM OFFERS A GLIMPSE INTO LOCAL HISTORY – The Buffalo News

Aerospace museums in New York (state)
Museums in Erie County, New York
Buildings and structures in Niagara Falls, New York